Katherine McFetridge is an American rower. She won a silver medal in the women's single sculls at the 2015 Pan American Games.

References

American female rowers
Rowers at the 2015 Pan American Games
Pan American Games silver medalists for the United States
Living people
Year of birth missing (living people)
Pan American Games medalists in rowing
Medalists at the 2015 Pan American Games
21st-century American women